Canariognapha is a monotypic genus of European ground spiders containing the single species, Canariognapha parwis. It was first described by J. Wunderlich in 2011, and has only been found in Spain.

References

Gnaphosidae
Monotypic Araneomorphae genera
Spiders of the Canary Islands